Choristoneura simonyi is a species of moth of the family Tortricidae. It is found on the Canary Islands.

The wingspan is 16–19 mm.

The larvae feed on Adenocarpus and Globularia species, as well as on Nicotiana glauca.

References

Moths described in 1892
Choristoneura